Lincoln International LLC is a multinational independent investment bank and financial services company specializing in advisory services and financings on middle market transactions. The firm works with publicly traded and privately owned companies, financial sponsors (private equity, venture capital, family offices, and hedge funds), and lenders.  The firm provides  advisory services including mergers & acquisitions, capital advisory consisting of growth equity, debt  and restructuring advisory, valuations and opinions, private funds advisory and joint ventures & partnering. The firm completed more than 400 advisory assignments globally in 2021, as well as over 10,000 debt and equity valuations.

The firm, which is headquartered in Chicago, Illinois, was founded in 1996. The company operates through 23 offices in North America (Atlanta, Chicago, Dallas, Los Angeles, Miami, New York and San Francisco), Europe (Amsterdam, Brussels, Frankfurt, London, Madrid, Milan, Munich, Paris, Stockholm, Vienna and Zurich), Asia (Beijing, Mumbai, Bangalore and Tokyo) and South America (São Paulo).

History
The firm was founded by Rob Barr and Jim Lawson, as well as Ed Hanlon and Eric Malchow, as a boutique investment banking firm, Lincoln Partners, in 1996. Barr and Lawson had worked together since 1981 and they began to work with Hanlon in 1988 and Malchow in 1994. Prior to founding Lincoln Partners, the partners spent most of their time working for Paine Webber, which was acquired by UBS in 2000.

Through the late 1990s, Lincoln Partners grew to an organization of approximately 30 people and became a registered broker dealer.

In January 2006, Lincoln International was formed through the merger of Lincoln Partners and Peters Associates, two middle market investment banks based in the U.S. and Germany, respectively, as well as a team from KPMG joining to form a Paris office.  At the time of the merger, Lincoln International had offices in Chicago, Frankfurt, New York and Paris. The two firms had previously worked together through a strategic joint venture established in 2005.

As of December 2022, Lincoln International has over 850 employees and is eyeing an IPO in the near future.

References

 Lincoln International Focuses On U.K. PE.  Investment Dealers Digest, May 15, 2009 
 While Others Shrunk,. Lincoln International Grew.  Reuters Buyouts
 Lincoln International Turns to Health Care.  IDD Magazine, January 19, 2010
 Day in the Life: Lincoln Partners.  Monroe Street Journal (Stephen M. Ross School of Business) Feb 10, 2003

External links
 Lincoln International (company website)

Investment banks in the United States
American companies established in 1996
Financial services companies established in 1996
Banks established in 1996